A signature mark, in traditional bookbinding, is a letter, number or combination of either or both, which is printed at the bottom of the first page, or leaf, of a section. (The section is itself often known as a "signature", although technically this usage is incorrect.) The aim is to ensure that the binder can order the pages and sections in the correct order. Often the letters of the Latin alphabet have been used. The practice has been overtaken by advances in printing technology, and signature marks are rarely found in modern books.

Contemporary use of signature marks
A number of symbols traditionally used as binding signature marks were encoded in ISO 5426-2 and from there (to enable migration of data from the old standard) were transposed into Unicode.

 0x32  was re-encoded with 
 0x34 , with 
 0x37 , with 

 was added later. These latter two are the only codepoints in Unicode 4.0 to bear the annotation "binding signature mark".

See also

References

Page layout

fr:Signature#Signature de la feuille